Vladimir Nikitin may refer to:

Vladimir Nikitin (runner) (born 1992), Russian distance runner
Vladimir Nikitin (boxer) (born 1990), Russian boxer
Vladimir Nikitin (skier) (born 1959), Soviet-Russian cross-country skier
Vladimir Alekseevich Nikitin (born 1934), Soviet and Russian physicist, professor, laureate of the USSR State Prize (1983)
Vladimir Konstantinovich Nikitin (1911–1992), Soviet racing driver
Vladimir Mironovich Nikitin (1905–1979), Russian Orthodox bishop
Vladimir Nikolaevich Nikitin (1907–1993), Soviet physiologist
Vladimir Nikolayevich Nikitin (1848–1922), Russian army commander
Vladimir Nikitin (politician) (born 1948), Russian politician and deputy of the State Duma

See also
Nikitin